The Heron Group is a Triassic lithostratigraphic group (a sequence of rock strata) beneath the central and northern North Sea which is composed of alluvial deposits.

References

Triassic System of Europe
Geology of the North Sea